West Sulawesi University (Indonesian: Universitas Sulawesi Barat, abbreviated as UNSULBAR) is a public university based in Majene, West Sulawesi.

History 
UNSULBAR was one of the first universities created after the West Sulawesi province was created in 2004, though the university itself was founded in 2007. UNSULBAR was originally a private university, though by 2013 it became a public university.

Logo and philosophy 
UNSULBAR’s logo consists of several elements, each with its own meaning:

 Five lotus flower petals, where the number refers to Pancasila while the flower itself refers to an open personality and holistic nature.
 Coconut tree, referring to the existence of UNSULBAR that provides service for humanity and nature.
 An opened book, referring to scientific knowledge that highlights the importance of rationality, honesty, objectivity, as well as truth and justice.
 Open sea, referring to transformation, challenge, the breadth of ideas to achieve scientific knowledge excellence.
 Seven pillars, referring to the fourteen historical kingdoms of Mandar (West Sulawesi), seven on the river’s upstream, and the remaining on the river’s downstream.
 Sun, in reference to UNSULBAR’s meaning to society.
 Star, in reference to God and loyalty to the nation.

Academics

Faculties 
UNSULBAR has six faculties, and 18 study programs, as described in the following:

Faculty of Agriculture and Forestry 
Agribusiness

Forestry

Faculty of Health Science

Nursing

Faculty of Economics 
Accounting

Management

Faculty of Engineering 
Civil Engineering

Informatics Engineering

Faculty of Mathematics and Natural Sciences 
Mathematical Science

Faculty of Social Sciences and Politics

Law

International Relations

Faculty of Animal Husbandry and Fisheries 
Animal Husbandry

Aquaculture

Faculty of Teaching and Education Science 
Mathematics Education

Biology Education

English Education

Physics Education.

Ranking 
UNSULBAR is ranked 130th amongst all Indonesian universities according to Webometrics’ 2021 Report.

References 

Universities in Indonesia
2007 establishments in Indonesia